is a Japanese/Zainichi Korean race car driver who races with Japanese racing license.

His mother is Japanese. His father, Yoshihiro Ri, also known as Yoshihiro Kunimoto, is the 1983 All Japan Karting Champion and his uncle, Yoshihiko Ri, won same karting championship twice in 1980 and 1981. His younger brother, Yuji, is also a race car driver.

Racing career
Kunimoto began karting in 2001 when he was 12. After winning the All Japan Karting Championship FA Class in 2004, he entered Formula Toyota Racing School and took scholarship of Toyota. He began his car racing career in the 2005 Formula Toyota season, at the seventh round of the season in Tsukuba.

He competed in Formula Toyota and Formula Challenge Japan in 2006 and 2007, and won the championship of Formula Challenge Japan with three wins and ended runner-up in Formula Toyota in 2007.

In 2008, he raced in the All-Japan Formula Three for TOM'S and in the Super GT for apr, as a Toyota young Drivers Program (TDP) driver. He finished runner-up in the first Formula Three season.

2008 Macau Grand Prix

At the end of the season, Kunimoto went to Macau with TOM'S and won the Macau F3 Grand Prix, becoming the second Japanese driver to win the race after Takuma Sato.

Formula Renault 3.5 Series
Kunimoto joined Epsilon Euskadi for the last two Formula Renault 3.5 Series rounds of the 2009 season. He replaced Spaniard Dani Clos in the team's line-up at the Nürburgring and at the season finale at the new Ciudad del Motor de Aragón circuit.

He returned with the team for the 2010 season, partnering 2009 Eurocup Formula Renault 2.0 champion Albert Costa.

Racing record

24 Hours of Le Mans results

Complete Formula Renault 3.5 Series results
(key) (Races in bold indicate pole position) (Races in italics indicate fastest lap)

References

External links

 Keisuke Kunimoto official website 
 Profile – All-Japan Formula Three official website
 Profile – Super GT official website

24 Hours of Le Mans drivers
Formula Nippon drivers
World Series Formula V8 3.5 drivers
Japanese Formula 3 Championship drivers
Japanese people of Korean descent
Japanese racing drivers
South Korean people of Japanese descent
South Korean emigrants to Japan
South Korean racing drivers
Sportspeople from Yokohama
Super GT drivers
Zainichi Korean people
1989 births
Living people
Formula Challenge Japan drivers
Epsilon Euskadi drivers
Team LeMans drivers
TOM'S drivers